Kinney Point State Park is a  Washington marine state park in Jefferson County. The park is part of the Cascadia Marine Trail with campsites restricted to boaters arriving by other than motorized means. Park activities include fishing, clam digging, and crabbing.

References

External links
Kinney Point State Park Washington State Parks and Recreation Commission 
Kinney Point State Park Map Washington State Parks and Recreation Commission

State parks of Washington (state)
Parks in Jefferson County, Washington